The African butter catfish (Schilbe mystus) is a species of fish in the family Schilbeidae. It is native to many major river systems in Africa.   Other common names for the fish include butter fish, butter barbel, African glass catfish, lubangu, mystus catfish, silver barbel, and silver catfish.   It was originally described as Silurus mystus by Carl Linnaeus in 1758.

Description
The African butter catfish has a compressed body and an adipose fin is always present. It is a brownish color on the head and the dorsal surface of the fish, and silvery-white on the underside. The fins are usually colorless. The lifespan of the fish is estimated to be 6 to 7 years

It is commonly found in standing or slowly flowing open water of lakes, ponds, rivers, and shallow swamps where vegetation is present.  It is occasionally found in sandy or rocky streams, or shallow flood plains.  It feeds from mid-water and surface waters on fish, insects, crustaceans, ostracods, snails, seeds, leaves, roots, diatoms, algae, and fruit. It has been noted to feed on the fish species Elephant snout (Hyperopisus bebe) and Nile tilapia (Oreochromis niloticus).  The species is most active at night or in subdued light.  It spawns in the rainy season in September and October, by migrating into the floodwaters and tributaries of rivers and streams to spawn. It may spawn in multiple locations, depositing eggs on vegetation.

Uses
This fish is of commercial importance in many parts of Africa as an important food fish. It is also sold in the aquarium trade.  In northern Africa, the fish faces threats from dams, water pollution, drought, and water depletion.  Overall, the species is listed by the IUCN as Least Concern for central, northern, northeastern, and western Africa.  In eastern Africa, the species is in serious decline due to overfishing and exploitation and is assessed regionally as Vulnerable.

References 

Schilbe
Catfish of Africa
Freshwater fish of Angola
Freshwater fish of Kenya
Freshwater fish of Namibia
Freshwater fish of Tanzania
Fish of Botswana
Freshwater fish of West Africa
Fish of Cameroon
Fish of the Central African Republic
Fish of Chad
Fish of Egypt
Fish of Ethiopia
Fish of Sudan
Fish of Eswatini
Fish of Zambia
Fish of Zimbabwe
Fish described in 1758
Taxa named by Carl Linnaeus
Taxonomy articles created by Polbot